T-119 was a minesweeper of the Soviet Navy during World War II and the Cold War. Upon completion she was transferred to the Soviet Union under Lend-Lease as T-119; she was never returned to the United States. The ship was renamed several times in Soviet service and was scrapped on 4 November 1966. Because of the Cold War, the U.S. Navy was unaware of this fate and the vessel remained on the American Naval Vessel Register until she was struck on 1 January 1983.

Career 
Aspire was laid down on 1 November 1942 at Tampa, Florida, by the Tampa Shipbuilding Co.; launched on 27 December 1942; sponsored by Mrs. F. M. Arenberg; and completed on 29 September 1943. She was transferred to the Soviet Navy that same day as T-119. She was never returned to U.S. custody.

In Soviet service, the ship was renamed TB-24 on 11 July 1956, and VTR-YYAO on 8 June 1966. She was eventually scrapped on 4 November 1966.

Due to the ongoing Cold War, the U.S. Navy was unaware of this fate. They had reclassified the vessel as MSF-146 on 7 February 1955, and kept her on the American Naval Vessel Register until she was struck on 1 January 1983.

References

External links
 NavSource Online: Mine Warfare Vessel Photo Archive – Aspire (MSF 146) – ex-AM-146 – ex-AMc-123

Admirable-class minesweepers
Ships built in Tampa, Florida
1942 ships
World War II minesweepers of the United States
Admirable-class minesweepers of the Soviet Navy
World War II minesweepers of the Soviet Union
Cold War minesweepers of the Soviet Union